Maria “Masha” Polinsky is an American linguist specializing in theoretical syntax and study of heritage languages.

Career 
Polinsky was born in Moscow, Russia. She received a B.A. in philology from Moscow University in 1979, and an M.A. in 1983 and a Ph.D. in 1986 in linguistics from the Institute for Linguistics of the Russian Academy of Sciences. Her dissertation examined the structure of antipassives in several ergative languages.

She joined the University of Southern California as an Andrew Mellon Fellow in 1989, becoming an assistant professor in 1991 and an associate professor in 1995. She joined UC San Diego as an associate professor in 1997, later serving there as full professor and chair of the Department of Linguistics. In 2001 she founded the Heritage Language Program at that department. From 2006 to 2015 she was a professor and Director of the Language Science Lab at Harvard University. In 2015 she took a position as professor in the Department of Linguistics and an Associate Director of the Maryland Language Science Center at the University of Maryland. At Maryland, she established a research field station in Guatemala

Research
Polinsky's research focuses on the relationship between syntax and information structure (syntactic encoding of topic and focus), left and right dislocation, and more recently, on syntax-prosody interface. Polinsky has been a pioneer of heritage language study and has played an active role in introducing heritage languages into modern linguistic theory. Her research has explored the ways in which heritage speakers are different from other speakers and learners, and the consequences of these differences for our understanding of language learning. She has also been an active practitioner of experimental work on understudied languages, in the fieldwork setting. 

Recurrent themes in her syntactic research include long-distance dependencies, control/raising, ergativity, and scope. Polinsky is a strong advocate of a micro-typological approach to syntax, and she has done extensive primary work on Chukchi, several Austronesian languages (especially Polynesian and Malagasy), Mayan languages and languages of the Caucasus.

Honors
Polinsky has been a visiting professor at the Max-Planck Institute for Evolutionary Anthropology in Leipzig; Amsterdam University; the University of California, Berkeley; Massachusetts Institute of Technology, and the Ecole Normale Supérieure.

She has served as associate editor of the journals Language and Natural Language and Linguistic Theory, and is currently on the editorial boards of the Heritage Language Journal, Linguistic Discovery, and Linguistics. 

Since 2007 she has been the director of the annual Heritage Language Research Institute. 

In 2015 she was a Forum Lecturer at the Linguistic Society of America Linguistic Summer Institute.  In 2016 she was chosen as a member of the Linguistic Society of America's Fellows for "distinguished contributions to the discipline".

She is a fellow of the Norwegian Academy of Science and Letters.

Selected publications
 S. Montrul and M. Polinsky (eds.) 2022. "The Cambridge Handbook of Heritage Languages and Linguistics". 
 M. Polinsky (ed.) 2021. "The Oxford Handbook of Languages of the Caucasus". 
 M. Polinsky. 2018. "Heritage Languages and Their Speakers". Cambridge Studies in Linguistics. 
 M. Polinsky. 2016. "Deconstructing Ergativity: Two Types of Ergative Languages and Their Features," Oxford Studies in Comparative Syntax.
 M. Polinsky and O. Kagan. 2007. “Heritage languages: In the 'wild' and in the classroom,” Language and Linguistics Compass 1(5): 368–395.
 M. Polinsky. 2006. “Incomplete acquisition: American Russian,” Journal of Slavic Linguistics.
 M. Polinsky, E. Potsdam. 2002. “Backward control,” Linguistic Inquiry.
 M. Polinsky, E. Potsdam. 2001. “Long-distance agreement and topic in Tsez,” Natural Language & Linguistic Theory.
 B. Comrie, G. Stone and M. Polinsky. 1996. The Russian language in the twentieth century. Oxford University Press.
 M. Polinsky. 1995. American Russian: Language loss meets language acquisition, in Formal Approaches to Slavic Linguistics.
 B. Comrie and M. Polinsky, (eds.) 1993. Causatives and transitivity. John Benjamins.

References

External links 
 Harvard web page
 Video interview on Heritage Languages
 Video interview on Cognitive Advantages of Bilingualism
 University of Maryland Linguistics Faculty Page

Living people
Year of birth missing (living people)
Linguists from the United States
Linguists from Russia
Women linguists
Harvard University faculty
Fellows of the Linguistic Society of America
20th-century American non-fiction writers
21st-century American non-fiction writers
20th-century American women writers
21st-century American women writers
American women academics
Members of the Norwegian Academy of Science and Letters